George Alexander Kennedy may refer to:
 George A. Kennedy (sinologist) (1901–1960), American professor of Chinese at Yale University, 1938–1960
 George A. Kennedy (classicist) (born 1928), American classical scholar